Bacholi is a village in Satara district in the southern state of Maharashtra, India.

References

Villages in Satara district